Michael Riley is an English film producer. He is CEO of Bristol and London-based production company Sterling Pictures.

Biography
Born in Nottingham, Michael Riley grew up in Edwalton. He attended the University of Ulster in Coleraine, Northern Ireland, studying English, Media and Theatre studies.

His factual work includes documentaries in China about the Uyghurs in Xinjiang; Kenya where he produced the Turner Prize nominated short film Waiting for artist Zarina Bhimji; and India where he interviewed the 14th Dalai Lama at his palace in Dharamshala. He produced In A Land Of Plenty, a ten-part drama series for the BBC by Sterling Pictures (with TalkBack Productions). He continues to produce mainly feature films in the UK and many of his films have won awards at international film festivals.

He lives in South Gloucestershire and has a daughter, Evelyn Martha Riley and two sons, Edward Maxwell Riley and Elliott Alec Riley.

Filmography
1992: Mother's Day directed by Michael Riley for Yorkshire-Tyne Tees Television
1995: Boston Kickout directed by Paul Hills
1996: Hard Men directed by J.K. Amalou
1997: Loop directed by Allan Niblo
2000: Out Of Depth directed by Simon Marshall
2001: In A Land Of Plenty directed by Hettie MacDonald and David Moore
2001: Lava (2001 film) directed by Joe Tucker
2007: Vampire Diary directed by Mark James and Phil O'Shea
2007: A Girl and a Gun directed by David L G Hughes
2007: Sugarhouse directed by Gary Love
2007: Outlanders directed by Dominic Lees
2007: The Man Who Would Be Queen directed by J.K. Amalou
2008: China's Wild West directed by Urszula Pontikos
2008: French Film directed by Jackie Oudney
2009: The Good Times Are Killing Me directed by John L'Ecuyer
2010: Deviation directed by J.K. Amalou
2011: Zero directed by David Barrouk
2011: Hard Boiled Sweets directed by David L.G. Hughes
2012: The Seasoning House directed by Paul Hyett
2012: Scar Tissue (2012 film) directed by Scott Michell
2013: Soulmate directed by Axelle Carolyn
2016: 'Chosen (2016 film)' directed by Jasmin Dizdar
2017: Crowhurst directed by Simon Rumley
2017: Heretiks directed by Paul Hyett
2019: Sideshow directed by Adam Oldroyd
2020: The Ballad of Billy McCrae directed by Chris Crow
2021: Fear The Invisible Man directed by Paul Dudbridge
2022: Can You Hear Me? directed by Simon Hunter

Awards
 Milan International Film Festival - Best Film for Vampire Diary
 Cologne Conference - Top Ten for In A Land Of Plenty
 Mile High Horror Film Festival - Best Film for The Seasoning House
 Gibara International Film Festival - Best Film for Outlanders

Nominations
 Sundance Film Festival - Best Short Film for China's Wild West

External links
Sterling Pictures

1966 births
Living people
English film producers